Little Monadnock Mountain, is located in the towns of Fitzwilliam and Troy, New Hampshire. Most of the mountain is located within Rhododendron State Park; there are scenic vistas from ledges just below the summit. The 110 mile Metacomet-Monadnock Trail crosses the mountain.

The mountain is flanked by Gap Mountain four miles northeast and by the Franconia Range (not the major ridge in the White Mountains), 4.5 miles to the west; its south and east slopes drain into the Tully River, then to the Millers River, thence to the Connecticut River and Long Island Sound, while its north and west slopes drain into the Ashuelot River, thence to the Connecticut River.

Hiking
The summit ledges of Little Monadnock Mountain are accessible via the Metacomet-Monadnock Trail or by the shorter route from the Rhododendron State Park headquarters/trailhead in Fitzwilliam (1.2 mi/1.9 km to the summit). A loop (4.1 mi/6.5 km) via both trails is possible. The mountain is open to hiking, picnicking, and snowshoeing in the winter. Leashed pets are allowed in Rhododendron State Park.

Conservation
Rhododendron State Park features the largest natural grove of native rhododendron in northern New England. The grove has been recognized as a National Natural Landmark. A loop trail through the grove is accessible from the park trailhead.

See also

 Mount Monadnock
 Gap Mountain
 Royalston Falls

References

 Southern New Hampshire Trail Guide. The Appalachian Mountain Club, Boston, 1999.
 The Metacomet-Monadnock Trail Guide. 9th Edition. The Appalachian Mountain Club. Amherst, Massachusetts, 1999

External links
 "New England's Scenic Trail is Secure". Appalachian Mountain Club.
 "Rhododendron State Park trail map".

Mountains of Cheshire County, New Hampshire
Mountains of New Hampshire
Fitzwilliam, New Hampshire
Troy, New Hampshire
Monadnock, Little